Alfred Owen Crozier (1863–1939) was a Midwest attorney who wrote eight books on the political, legal, and monetary problems of the United States.

Biography
He is best known for his work US Money Vs Corporation Currency, "Aldrich Plan," Wall Street Confessions! Great Bank Combine (1912), which argues against the formation of The Federal Reserve. He feared national banking, but he feared private control of the United States money system even more.

Publications 
The Magnet: A Romance of the Battles of Modern Giants (1908)
 Nation of Nations: The Way to Permanent Peace; A Supreme Constitution for the Government of Governments (1914)
 League of Nations: Shall It Be an Alliance, or a Nation of Nations? Must Be One or the Other! (1919)
 What Ails our Country?: Cause of and Cure for Booms, Crashes, Depressions and Bank Failures (1933).

See also
 Panic of 1907

References

External links
 

1863 births
1939 deaths
American lawyers